The 1917 Columbia Lions football team was an American football team that represented Columbia University as an independent during the 1917 college football season. In his third and final season as head coach, T. Nelson Metcalf led the team to a 2–4 record, though the Lions outscored opponents .  The team played its home games on South Field, part of the university's campus in Morningside Heights in Upper Manhattan.

Schedule

References

Columbia
Columbia Lions football seasons
Columbia Lions football